The 1977 2. divisjon was a Norway's second-tier football league season.

The league was contested by 30 teams, divided into a total of three groups; A and B (non-Northern Norwegian teams) and Group C, a district group which contained teams from Northern Norway. The winners of group A and B were promoted to the 1978 1. divisjon. The second placed teams in group A and B met the winner of group C in a qualification round where the winner was promoted to 1. divisjon. The bottom two teams inn all groups were relegated to the 3. divisjon. 

Skeid won group A with 25 points. Lyn won group B with 25 points. Both teams promoted to the 1978 1. divisjon. Mo won group C and qualified for and the promotion play-offs but was not promoted.

Tables

Group A

Group B

Group C

Promotion play-offs

Results
Mo – Odd 0–0
Steinkjer – Mo 0–0
Odd – Steinkjer 1–5

Play-off table

References

Norwegian First Division seasons
1977 in Norwegian football
Norway
Norway